Pometon is a genus of beetles in the family Cicindelidae, containing the following species:

 Pometon bolivianus Huber, 1999
 Pometon singularis Fleutiaux, 1899

References

Cicindelidae